Viona Harrer (born 5 November 1986) is a German female ice hockey goaltender, who played for the otherwise all-male Team Tölzer Löwen and for the Germany women's national ice hockey team.  At a 2009 Women's Four Nations Tournament held in Slovakia, Harrer was named the tournament's top goaltender.

Career
Harrer began her career as ice hockey goaltender at the age of 5 at SB Rosenheim. Later she trained with TEV Miesbach and was the regular goaltender with the ESC Planegg in the Ladies-Bundesliga, before she ahead of the season 2003/04 moved to her grandparents in Reichersbeuern, to play in the DNL (Rookie)-Team of Tölzer Löwen (Lions of Bad Tölz). In the season 2007/08 she played in the colors of the Tölzer Profimannschaft as the first woman ever to play in the German professional Eishockeyoberliga. As the Tölzer Löwen moved on to play in the 2. Eishockey-Bundesliga she transferred to TSV Erding, where her elder brother Daniel had played for several years. In the season 2010/11, she played for TSV Erding in the Deutsche Fraueneishockey-Liga (women league elite in Germany).
In 2012, she was playing again for Tölzer Löwen. She stands  and weighs .

Viona Harrer became a Corporal in the German Bundeswehr Sportfördergruppe der Bundeswehr.

Internationally
Already at the age of 16 years old, she belonged to the extended squad if the Deutsche Nationalmannschaft (German Ladies Ice Hockey National Team) and traveled to the 2003 World Championship in Peking, which was canceled due to the SARS-Epidemics. One year later in Halifax, Nova Scotia, Canada, she had her first assignment in a world championship. Due to some injuries she had to skip the 2006 Winter Olympics, and could not participate internationally until 2007.

At the 2008 World Championship, she and her German team finished 9th and were relegated to Division I.

See also
 Germany women's national ice hockey team

References

External links

1986 births
Living people
People from Kolbermoor
Sportspeople from Upper Bavaria
Olympic ice hockey players of Germany
Ice hockey players at the 2014 Winter Olympics
German women's ice hockey goaltenders